The 1948–49 Nationalliga A season was the 11th season of the Nationalliga A, the top level of ice hockey in Switzerland. Eight teams participated in the league, and Zurcher SC won the championship.

First round

Group 1

Group 2

Final round

5th-8th place

Relegation 
 Grasshopper-Club - HC Ambrì-Piotta 4:3

External links
 Championnat de Suisse 1948/49

National League (ice hockey) seasons
Swiss
1948–49 in Swiss ice hockey